Serviam: I Will Serve is a 2022 Austrian thriller film directed by Ruth Mader, starring Maria-Victoria Dragus, Leona Lindinger, Anna Elisabeth Berger, Sophia Gomez-Schreiber and .

Cast
 Maria-Victoria Dragus as Sister Philine
 Leona Lindinger as Sabine
 Anna Elisabeth Berger as Sandra
 Sophia Gomez-Schreiber as Martha
  as Sister Agnes
 Udo Samel

Release
The film premiered at the Locarno Film Festival on 9 August 2022.

Reception
Guy Lodge of Variety wrote that "this supremely well-made chiller announces itself upfront as a cut above your average nunsploitation exercise with its stark, stringent mise-en-scène and jabs of religious inquiry via surreal, Bible-based animated interludes." Muriel Del Don of Cineuropa wrote that the film "works intelligently to combine spiritual challenges, a thriller, and the world of childhood, ultimately transforming innocence into extremism."

Neil Young of Screen Daily wrote that "As a determinedly downbeat exercise in moody atmospherics, Serviam — I Will Serve passes muster."

References

External links
 
 

Austrian thriller films
2022 thriller films